Shenin Qaqazan (also Romanized as Shenīn Qāqāzān and Shenīn Qāqzān; also known as Shenīn and Shanin Ghaghzan Sharghi) is a village in Narjeh Rural District, in the Central District of Takestan County, Qazvin Province, Iran. At the 2006 census, its population was 80, in 20 families.

References 

Populated places in Takestan County